The first election to Fermanagh and Omagh District Council, part of the Northern Ireland local elections on 22 May 2014, returned 40 members to the newly-formed council via Single Transferable Vote.

Sinn Féin emerged as the largest party with seventeen seats, eight ahead of the Ulster Unionist Party and four seats away from overall control. The council would act as a shadow authority until 1 April 2015, where Sinn Féin's Thomas O'Reilly would become Chairman and Paul Robinson of the DUP Vice Chairman.

Results by party

Districts summary

|- class="unsortable" align="centre"
!rowspan=2 align="left"|Ward
! % 
!Cllrs
! %
!Cllrs
! %
!Cllrs
! %
!Cllrs
! %
!Cllrs
!rowspan=2|TotalCllrs
|- class="unsortable" align="center"
!colspan=2 bgcolor=""| Sinn Féin
!colspan=2 bgcolor="" | UUP
!colspan=2 bgcolor=""| SDLP
!colspan=2 bgcolor="" | DUP
!colspan=2 bgcolor="white"| Others
|-
|align="left"|Enniskillen
|21.7
|2
|bgcolor="40BFF5"|24.2
|bgcolor="40BFF5"|2
|9.5
|1
|19.0
|1
|25.6
|0
|6
|-
|align="left"|Erne East
|bgcolor="#008800"|51.3
|bgcolor="#008800"|3
|16.2
|1
|12.9
|1
|15.9
|1
|3.7
|0
|6
|-
|align="left"|Erne North
|24.6
|1
|bgcolor="40BFF5"|38.1
|bgcolor="40BFF5"|2
|16.6
|1
|13.5
|0
|7.2
|0
|5
|-
|align="left"|Erne West
|bgcolor="#008800"|39.3
|bgcolor="#008800"|2
|23.4
|1
|13.9
|1
|6.1
|0
|17.3
|1
|5
|-
|align="left"|Mid Tyrone
|bgcolor="#008800"|57.3
|bgcolor="#008800"|4
|17.1
|1
|12.7
|1
|8.5
|0
|4.4
|0
|6
|-
|align="left"|Omagh
|bgcolor="#008800"|37.5
|bgcolor="#008800"|2
|11.5
|1
|23.2
|2
|20.0
|1
|7.8
|0
|6
|-
|align="left"|West Tyrone
|bgcolor="#008800"|44.0
|bgcolor="#008800"|3
|17.4
|1
|15.9
|1
|19.5
|1
|3.2
|0
|6
|- class="unsortable" class="sortbottom" style="background:#C9C9C9"
|align="left"| Total
|40.1
|17
|20.9
|9
|14.7
|7
|14.6
|5
|9.7
|1
|40
|-
|}

District results

Enniskillen

2014: 2 x UUP, 2 x Sinn Féin, 1 x DUP, 1 x SDLP

Erne East

2014: 3 x Sinn Féin, 1 x UUP, 1 x DUP, 1 x SDLP

Erne North

2014: 2 x UUP, 1 x Sinn Féin, 1 x DUP, 1 x SDLP

Erne West

2014: 2 x Sinn Féin, 1 x UUP, 1 x SDLP, 1 x Independent

Mid Tyrone

2014: 4 x Sinn Féin, 1 x UUP, 1 x SDLP

Omagh

2014: 2 x Sinn Féin, 2 x SDLP, 1 x DUP, 1 x UUP

West Tyrone

2014: 3 x Sinn Féin, 1 x UUP, 1 x DUP, 1 x SDLP

* Incumbent

Changes during the term

† Co-options

‡ Changes in affiliation

Last updated 25 March 2019.

Current composition: see Fermanagh and Omagh District Council.

References

2014 Northern Ireland local elections
21st century in County Fermanagh
21st century in County Tyrone
Elections in County Fermanagh
Elections in County Tyrone